Los Claxons is a Mexican pop rock band from Monterrey, Mexico, initially formed in 2004. Its members include: Ignacio Llantada (vocals, guitar, piano), Mauricio Sánchez (vocals, guitar), Edgar "Cholo" Lozano (electric guitar), Pablo Gonzalez Sarre (bass, guitar), and Cesareo Castillo (drums).

History 

Los Claxons started playing locally, which resulted in their recognition around Monterrey. Signed to the label Movic Records, released their first album Sin Ganga in 2004 where hit singles like "Personajes" and "Mis Manos Necias" led to their wide recognition in Mexico. This first album was recorded at El Cielo recording studios, a joint music studio located within Movic Records.

Ever since, the band has gained great exposure and popularity around Mexico, sharing the stage with artists like Maroon 5. They have recorded over 6 albums including Un Día De Sol co-produced by the band and 16-time Grammy winner, Thom Russo. They also composed songs for the movie Cantinflas alongside other notable artists including Enrique Bunbury, Aleks Syntek, and La Santa Cecilia. In October 2015, Los Claxons released their 6th studio album "Centro, Sur y al Otro Lado" produced solely by them, which debuted #1 on iTunes Mexico and US, was in the Top 3 category of CD sales in Mexico and their single "Hasta Que Vuelvas a Verme" charted within the Top 5 chart in Mexican radio.

Los Claxons is currently recording their 7th studio album "Maldita Felicidad". Their first single from this upcoming album was released on radio April 16 and in digital platforms on April 20. The single instantly charted on Spotify playlists and is currently on the Top 20 on national radio.

The band has been nominated for two Latin Grammys:

– Best Pop Album (2010)

– Best Pop/Rock Album (2012)

Discography
"Tómame" was their first ever released single.

Sin Ganga

Sin Ganga (Edición Especial)

En Primera

Los Claxons

Camino A Encontrarte

Un Día De Sol

Diez En Vivo (Live)

Centro, Sur y Al Otro Lado

Maldita felicidad

References 

Mexican rock music groups
Mexican alternative rock groups
Capitol Latin artists
Warner Music Latina artists
Latin pop music groups